Piqeras (Pikerni) is a village in the former municipality of Lukovë, Vlorë County, southern Albania. At the 2015 local government reform it became part of the municipality Himarë.

Demographics 

In fieldwork conducted in 1992, Piqeras had a total population of 991 and inhabited by an Orthodox Albanian majority with a minority of 100 Muslim Albanians and 50 Greeks.

History 
During the Ottoman period (15th–1912) the village enjoyed a special administrative status as part of the Himara region. In 1742 the neighbouring Muslim Albanian village of Borsh attacked Piqeras making some Albanian speaking Orthodox Christians flee abroad to southern Italy where they founded the village of Villa Badessa. In 1744 an attack by Muslim Albanian groups forced the Greek-speaking inhabitants in Piqeras to leave the village. In 1798 the village became the target of an attack by the forces of Ali Pasha who managed to control the southern part of Himara. In 1875, some Albanian speaking families with Piqeras heritage from Villa Badessa decided to relocate to Nea Pikerni, a settlement founded by the Greek state in the Peloponnese which after some time was abandoned due to economic and relocation hardships.

A Greek school was operating in Piqeras from 1871. Greek education was sponsored by the local diaspora and in 1902-1904 it was expanded with a girls' and a middle level school. In 1914 local armed groups from Piqeras supported the struggle for the establishment of the Autonomous Republic of Northern Epirus and participated in fierce fighting for control of nearby Fterrë village and the heights around Çorraj village.

The village is the birthplace of the Albanian national hero Vasil Laçi who attempted to assassinate Victor Emmanuel III, King of Italy and Shefqet Bej Vërlaci, Prime Minister of Albania after the occupation of Albania by fascist Italy.

Notable people 
Vasil Laçi, patriot and anti-monarchist.

References

Beaches of Albania
Populated places in Himara
Villages in Vlorë County
Albanian Ionian Sea Coast
Labëria